The World Series of Pop Culture is a VH1 game show tournament program. The first season was taped in New York City from April 29 - April 30, 2006 at the Ziegfeld Theater (a movie theater named in homage of the former Ziegfeld Theatre). The top prize was $250,000 provided by Alltel Wireless. The tournament first aired on July 10, 2006, concluding on August 3, 2006. The hosts for the first season were Pat Kiernan and Lisa Guerrero.

The inaugural competition was won by Atlanta-area residents Mason Spencer, Jodi Roth and Alexandra Clark, collectively known as El Chupacabra. They split the $250,000 cash prize, and won an entry for Season 2.

Tournament Bracket

Teams
El Chupacabra (Alexandra Clark, Jodi Roth, Mason Spencer) (Winner)
 The Boeghy Bunch (Jason Boegh, Jim Ghezzi, Amanda Jiggins) (Runner-up)
 Almost Perfect Strangers (Larry Brown, Kim Eaton, Molly Martin)
 The Velvet Rope Revolution (Dave Callaham, Alex Carter, Nne Ebong)
 Peanut Butter & Ginelli (Mike Ginelli, Matt Slocum, Brian Turtle)
 Cheetara (Erin Davidson, Katherine Gotsick, Amber Tillett)
 PDX 503 (Wil Olandria, Brian Panganiban, Paul Panganiban)
 I Heart Jake Ryan (Erin Freeman, Claire Johnstone, Martha Scales)
 Highly Effective People (Drew Hunter, Catherine Lamb, Adam Sass)
 We're What Willis Was Talking About (Angela Pacheco, Helena Pacheco, Joe Pacheco)
 The Men of Vision (Erick Krigsvold, Freeman Martin, Matt McCoo)
 Ronnie, Bobby, Ricky & Mike (MacArthur Antigua, Michael Garcia, A.J. Sustaita)
 Sexual Chocolate (Anthony Ashton, Jeff Yeatman, Natalie Zaidman)
 Team Smarty Pants (Collin Hattaway, Brianne Hattaway (Liss), Lauren Liss)
 3 the Hard Way (Laurie Ewing, Dave Lerman, Drew Stepek)
 Lazer Wolves (Matt Ayers, Zach Braun, Joe Rahim)

Competition highlights 
 Almost Perfect Strangers had an 'almost perfect' Sweet 16 round, in which they answered every question correctly, with the exception of a steal from the opposing team, Men of Vision.
 In one instance, two contestants from El Chupacabra and We're What Willis Was Talking About exhausted the list of possible tiebreaker answers (the category was American Idol finalists), which necessitated a second tiebreaker. Notably, they listed the Idol finalists in order from the first to the fourth season. The team members also provided an equal number of correct answers in the second tiebreaker, which led to a third tiebreaker. El Chupacabra finally broke through in the third tiebreaker, with one correct answer to zero.
 Even though the Semifinals were to be continued along with the Finals, VH1 revealed the teams that would be in the Finals by showing a commercial with the teams following the first showing of the Semifinals.
 The final question of the competition dealt with the name of the fictional college attended by Denise Huxtable on The Cosby Show. Both players failed to provide the correct answer, Hillman College.

Pop Culture contestants in pop culture 
 Peanut Butter & Ginelli team members Mike Ginelli and Brian Turtle invented the Six Degrees of Kevin Bacon trivia game.
 Velvet Rope Revolution team member Dave Callaham co-wrote the 2005 feature film Doom.
 Ronnie, Bobby, Ricky & Mike team member MacArthur Antigua was previously a contestant on an episode of The Weakest Link.
 El Chupacabra team member Alexandra Burris appeared on Who Wants to be a Millionaire on June 9, 2009. She won $50,000 before time ran out, carrying her game over into the next day.

After the Tournament 
 El Chupacabra, as defending champion, returned for the 2007 tournament, where they lost in the first round.
 The members of Cheetara would go on to replace Lisa Guerrero as backstage interviewer(s) for the 2007 tournament.
 Martha Scales, a member of I Heart Jake Ryan, appeared on "Who Wants To Be A Millionaire" during pop culture week, where she won $25,000

External links 
 Official season 1 site

2006 American television seasons